Thierry Laget (born 2 October 1959, Clermont-Ferrand) is a French novelist, essayist, literary critic and translator.

Biography 
He has provided editions of texts by Jacques Rivière including Quelques progrès dans l'étude du cœur humain, by Marcel Proust, including Le Côté de Guermantes and Les plaisirs et les jours, then Gustave Flaubert including Madame Bovary. Thierry has also published several essays on Proust.

Prizes 
 1992: prix Fénéon for Iris (Éditions Gallimard, 1991)
 2012: prix Maurice Genevoix for La Lanterne d'Aristote (Gallimard, 2011)

Bibliography 

 Novels
 Florence, via Ricasoli 47 (Belfond, 1987)
 Comme Tosca au théâtre (Belfond, 1989)
 Iris (Gallimard, 1991) - prix Fénéon 1992
 Rois d'Avanie (Julliard, 1995)
 Roman écrit à la main (Gallimard, 2000)
 Supplément aux mensonges d'Hilda (Gallimard, 2003)
 Madame Deloblat (Gallimard, 2006)
 La Lanterne d'Aristote (Gallimard, 2011) – prix Maurice Genevoix 2012
 Prose
 Florentiana (Gallimard, 1993)
 Bergers d'Arcadie, méditations en prose, eaux-fortes de Christiane Vielle (Fata Morgana, 1995)
 La Fiancée italienne, (biographie d'Alaïde Banti, liée au mouvement des Macchiaioli) (Gallimard, 1997)
 À des dieux inconnus (Gallimard, 2003) 
 Les Quais minéraliers, poème en prose, aquatintes de Christiane Vielle (Al Manar, 2004)
 Portraits de Stendhal (Gallimard, 2008) 
 Bibliothèques de nuit (Gallimard, 2010) 
 Provinces (L'Arbre vengeur, 2013)
 Atlas des amours fugaces (L'Arbre vengeur, 2013)
 Le ciel est un grand timide (Fario, coll. Théodore Balmoral, 2016)
 Poetry
 Semer son ombre (Al Manar, 2008)
 Texts issued in the magazine Théodore Balmoral 
 Parques de Sceaux, n°51
 Douje mou de patué, n°52/53
 Les Yeux au ciel, n°56/57
 Paysage de Dalécarlie, n°58
 Ne pas déranger, n°59/60
 Le Songe de Polyphème, n°61
 L’Attente, n°62/63
 Sur le limbe du sextant, n°64
 Deux maisons, n°65
 Les Copeaux, n°66/67		
 Sur le limbe du sextant (2), n°68
 En chemin, n°69/70	
 Bialot, l’inoubliable, n°71
 Rouge Follain, n°72/73
 Sur le limbe du sextant (3), n°72/73
 Les Voyages en zig-zag de Pierre Girard, n°72/73
 Discours de Stockholm, n°74

External links 
 Official website
 Thierry Laget on the site of the Académie française
 Thierry Laget on Babelio
 Thierry Laget on France Culture
 Thierry Laget - La lanterne d'Aristote on YouTube

20th-century French novelists
21st-century French novelists
20th-century French essayists
21st-century French essayists
French literary critics
Italian–French translators
Prix Fénéon winners
1959 births
Writers from Clermont-Ferrand
Living people